Vasper may refer to:

Vasper, Tennessee, a community in Campbell County, Tennessee
Peter Vasper, a former English footballer